"Do You Know What It Means to Miss New Orleans" is a song written by Eddie DeLange and Louis Alter, which was first heard in the movie New Orleans in 1947, where it was performed by Louis Armstrong and sung by Billie Holiday.

The song has been recorded by various artists, including:

References

1947 songs
Songs about New Orleans
Music of New Orleans
Louis Armstrong songs
Songs with music by Louis Alter
Songs with lyrics by Eddie DeLange
Film theme songs